Emirdağ District is a district of Afyonkarahisar Province of Turkey. Its seat is the town Emirdağ. Its area is 2,103 km2, and its population is 42,327 (2021).

Composition
There are three municipalities in Emirdağ District:
 Davulga
 Emirdağ
 Gömü

There are 69 villages in Emirdağ District:

 Ablak
 Adayazı
 Ağılcık
 Alibeyce
 Aşağıaliçomak
 Aşağıkurudere
 Aşağıpiribeyli
 Avdan
 Aydınyaka
 Bademli
 Bağlıca
 Balcam
 Başkonak
 Beyköy
 Beyören
 Burunarkaç
 Büyüktuğluk
 Camili
 Çatallı
 Çaykışla
 Çiftlikköy
 Dağılgan
 Dağınık
 Daydalı
 Demircili
 Dereköy
 Ekizce
 Elhan
 Emirinköyü
 Eskiakören
 Eşrefli
 Gedikevi
 Gelincik
 Gözeli
 Güneyköy
 Güneysaray
 Güveççi
 Hamzahacılı
 Karaağaç
 Karacalar
 Karayatak
 Kılıçlar
 Kılıçlı Kavlaklı
 Kırkpınar
 Kuruca
 Leylekli
 Örenköy
 Özkan
 Salihler
 Sığracık
 Soğukkuyu
 Suvermez
 Tabaklar
 Tepeköy
 Tezköy
 Toklucak
 Topdere
 Türkmen
 Türkmenakören
 Umraniye
 Veysel
 Yarıkkaya
 Yarımca
 Yavuz
 Yenikapı
 Yeniköy
 Yukarıkurudere
 Yüreğil
 Yusufağa

References

External links
 District governor's official website 

Districts of Afyonkarahisar Province